Fernie Secondary School (formed in 1908) is a public high school in the city of Fernie, British Columbia, it is part of the School District 5 Southeast Kootenay. The school holds grades 7 through 12.

The original school building, located in the downtown core of Fernie, was home to the school from 1908, until 1999. In 1999, a new school building was opened on a property adjacent to the Fernie Golf and Country Club. The original building sat abandoned for 8 years before being redeveloped into condominiums. FSS has a population of about 500 students in Grades 7 to 12 and usually hosts a small number of international students at a time.

F.S.S has one of the largest gymnasiums in the East Kootenays, and now has its own HIMU Disc Golf Course available for public use.

High schools in British Columbia
Educational institutions established in 1908
1908 establishments in British Columbia